Peter Lötscher (4 February 1941 – 24 October 2017) was a Swiss fencer. He won a silver medal in the team épée event at the 1972 Summer Olympics.

References

External links
 

1941 births
2017 deaths
Swiss male épée fencers
Olympic fencers of Switzerland
Fencers at the 1968 Summer Olympics
Fencers at the 1972 Summer Olympics
Olympic silver medalists for Switzerland
Olympic medalists in fencing
Sportspeople from Basel-Stadt
Medalists at the 1972 Summer Olympics
20th-century Swiss people
21st-century Swiss people